Pseudocossus is a genus of moths of the family Cossidae from Madagascar.

Type species:  Pseudocossus uliginosus Kenrick, 1914

Species
Pseudocossus boisduvalii Viette, 1955
Pseudocossus mineti Yakovlev, 2011
Pseudocossus olsoufieffae Yakovlev, 2011
Pseudocossus pljustchi Yakovlev & Saldaitis, 2011
Pseudocossus uliginosus Kenrick, 1914
Pseudocossus viettei Yakovlev, 2011

References

Pseudocossinae
Cossidae genera
Taxa named by George Hamilton Kenrick